Psychohistorical Crisis is a science fiction novel by American-Canadian writer Donald Kingsbury, published by Tor Books in 2001. An expansion of his 1995 novella "Historical Crisis", it is a re-imagining of the world of Isaac Asimov's Foundation series, set after the establishment of the Second Empire. The book is neither officially authorized by Asimov's estate (as they had previously done with the Second Foundation Trilogy), nor is it intended to be recognized as part of his continuity.

Psychohistorical Crisis was the 2002 winner of the Prometheus Award.

Story
Eron Osa had been one of the Pscholars, the secret leaders behind the Second Empire of humanity. For a crime he cannot remember, he was sentenced, not to death, but to the removal of his fam, his symbiotic computer mind. Without the augmentation of his brain by his electronic familiar, he can barely function on Splendid Wisdom, the capital of the Empire. Without one, simply navigating the streets of the planetary megalopolis is nearly impossible. Worse, the traumatic removal has stolen large chunks of his memory, which were never stored in his biological brain. Eron must figure out what he did and why, and he must do so soon...

Reviews
Review by David Langford (2002) in Vector 221
Review by Nigel Brown (2002) in Interzone, #178 April 2002
Review by Peter Heck (2002) in Asimov's Science Fiction, June 2002
Review by Graham Sleight (2002) in The New York Review of Science Fiction, June 2002
Review by Russell Blackford (2002) in The New York Review of Science Fiction, September 2002
Review by K. V. Bailey (2002) in Foundation, #86 Autumn 2002
Review by A. M. Dellamonica [as by Alyx Dellamonica] (2002) in Locus, #492 January 2002, (2002)
Review by John Clute (2003) in Scores: Reviews 1993 - 2003
Review [French] by Éric Vial (2004) in Galaxies, #35

References

External links 

2001 American novels
2001 science fiction novels
Foundation universe books
Parallel literature
Tor Books books